The Consortium of Universities of the Washington Metropolitan Area is a nonprofit educational association of 19 colleges and universities in the greater Washington, D.C. metropolitan area and the Smithsonian Institutions.

Founded in 1964, the consortium facilitates the processing of course cross-registration between all member universities and universalizes library access among some of its member universities.  It also provides joint procurement programs, joint academic initiatives and campus public safety training.

Nine of the consortium members have formed the Washington Research Library Consortium (WRLC).  WRLC provides joint library services, student and faculty borrowing at all eight participating libraries, and a shared digital library system (ALADIN).  Additionally, WRLC enables cooperative collection development and off-site storage services.

The Consortium Research Fellows Program is a partnership between the Consortium of Universities of the Washington Metropolitan Area and several Department of Defense agencies which allows professors and students to work in DoD settings.

Member universities

Affiliate members 

 Johns Hopkins University
 The Smithsonian Institutions

References

External links
Consortium website

College and university associations and consortia in the United States
 
Library consortia in Washington, D.C.
Library consortia in Maryland
Library consortia in Virginia